Hynek Hanza (*14 October 1977) is a Czech Civic Democratic politician who serves as Senator representing Teplice and a Mayor of Teplice as a successor of Jaroslav Kubera.

Biography
Hanza was born in Teplice in 1977. He studied Teplice Grammar School and then Economy at Technical University of Liberec.  He joined the Civic Democratic Party (ODS) in 1997. His father co-founded ODS in Teplice.

When Mayor of Teplice Jaroslav Kubera decided to step down in 2018 Hanza replaced him in the position. When Kubera died 2 years later. Hanza replaced him as a Senator of Teplice district following a by-election.

References

1977 births
Civic Democratic Party (Czech Republic) mayors
Civic Democratic Party (Czech Republic) Senators
People from Teplice
Mayors of places in the Czech Republic
Living people
Mayors of Teplice
Technical University of Liberec alumni